Odysseas Lymperakis (born 5 June 1998) is a Greek professional footballer who plays as a left-back for Super League 2 club Panserraikos.

Honours
Kavala
Gamma Ethniki: 2018–19

References

1998 births
Living people
Greek footballers
Greece under-21 international footballers
Gamma Ethniki players
Super League Greece players
Kavala F.C. players
Panionios F.C. players
OFI Crete F.C. players
Volos N.F.C. players
Panserraikos F.C. players
Association football defenders
Footballers from Kavala